Rafael Lucas Rodríguez Caballero (March 24, 1915 in San Ramón – January 29, 1981) was a Costa Rican biologist, botanist, and artist known for his drawings of Costa Rican wildlife.  He was a recipient of the Magón National Prize for Culture in 1977.

References

1915 births
1981 deaths
People from San Ramón, Costa Rica
Costa Rican people of Spanish descent
Costa Rican biologists
Costa Rican botanists
20th-century biologists